, is a 2014 supernatural, mystery anime series based on the Japanese mixed-media project, Hamatora. It is set in the year 2014 where select humans called Minimum Holders have been discovered to possess supernatural abilities. The series is a direct sequel to Hamatora: The Animation and features the same main cast as the original one. Set three months after the events of The Animation, the story follows Minimum Holders known as Hamatora who solve cases.

The series was produced by Lerche, with NAZ (the first season's production company) credited for production assistance. Seiji Kishi is directing the series while Jun Kumagi is the main writer. Character designs are done by Yū Wazu, based on the original character designs by Blood Lad's Yūki Kodama along with art direction by Fantasista Utamaro. The project was composed by Yukinori Kitajima. The music is being composed by Makoto Yoshimori.  The series premiered in Japan on July 8, 2014 and finished on September 23, 2014. The series was streamed on Crunchyroll during its first run. Animax UK also licensed the series to stream it on their official website.

People who purchased the first two volumes of the Hamatora: The Animation received early entry forms for tickets to attend the Hamatora Fes 2014.summer event which screened exclusive special footage of the series' sequel, Re:␣Hamatora at the Pacifico Yokohama on July 13, 2014. The series started collection in Blu-ray and DVD volumes on September 26, 2014.

The series uses two types of musical themes: an opening and an ending theme. The opening theme,  is performed by the collaborative unit of Livetune adding Takuro Sugawara (from 9mm Parabellum Bullet) while Ayami, the voice of Hamatoras Chiyū, performs the ending theme, "Brand New World." 


Episode list
The Japanese episode titles were presented in English, and are numbered as "Re:01", "Re:02", and so forth.

Home media

References

External links
Official anime website

Re: Hamatora